The Yaya is a river in Siberian Russia, a left tributary of the Chulym, that flows through Kemerovo and Tomsk oblasts. It originates in Kuznetsk Alatau. The urban-type settlement of Yaya is situated on this river.

References

Rivers of Kemerovo Oblast
Rivers of Tomsk Oblast